Ragna (Ragnheiður) Sigurðardóttir (born in Reykjavík on 10 August 1962) is an Icelandic writer, translator and artist. She studied at the Jan Van Eyck Academie in the Netherlands and also spent time in Denmark. In addition she studied French at Aix-en-Provence. In 1987 she debuted with a collection of her short stories and poems titled Stefnumót ("Date"), followed in by Fallegri en flugeldar ("More beautiful than fireworks", 1989), 27 herbergi ("27 rooms", 1991) and the novels Borg ("City", 1993), Skot ("Shot"), Strengir ("Strings"), Hið fullkomna landslag ("The Perfect Landscape", 2009) and Bónusstelpan ("The Cashier", 2011) In her career she has been long-listed for the International Dublin Literary Award.

She is married to the musician and allsherjargoði Hilmar Örn Hilmarsson. The couple have two daughters together.

References 

1962 births
Living people
Ragna Sigurdardottir
Ragna Sigurdardottir
Ragna Sigurdardottir
Ragna Sigurdardottir
Ragna Sigurdardottir
Ragna Sigurdardottir